Thomas Charles Ellis (1904 – 1995) was an Australian rugby league footballer who played in the 1920s and 1930s.

Background
Ellis was born at Balmain South in 1904.

Playing career
Ellis went on to come one of the finest players ever to represent the Newtown club. A Marrickville junior, Ellis played 11 seasons for Newtown between 1923-1933. 

He retired after winning the 1933 Grand Final, playing fullback in the Newtown Jets premiership team. A prolific goal kicker, Tom Ellis scored over 500 points in his 144 grade career at Newtown. 

His only representative appearance was in 1928, when he played one match for New South Wales.

He coached the Newtown third grade team for many years, and won the premiership with them in 1935. He was the brother of fellow Newtown legends Keith Ellis and Allan Ellis.

Tom Ellis died on 23 May 1995, aged 91.

References

1904 births
1995 deaths
Newtown Jets players
New South Wales rugby league team players
Australian rugby league players
Rugby league fullbacks
Rugby league players from Sydney